Veja State was a petty princely state in India's present state of Gujarat.

History 
During the British Raj, it ruled by Kshatriya Koli Chief And fell under the Baroda Agency, until its 1937 merger into the Baroda and Gujarat States Agency.

See also 
 Vejanoness (synonym or fellow state?)

References

Princely states of Gujarat

Koli princely states